is a Japanese band that debuted in 2000. Initially a fictional band that produced music for the 2001 Shunji Iwai film All About Lily Chou-Chou, the group later reformed in 2010 for the 10th anniversary of the film.  Lily Chou-Chou is not a person, but a fictional character.

Biography 

Lily Chou-Chou as a character was initially created by Shunji Iwai in 2000, as a part of an online novel that was posted on a BBS. The music was produced as a collaboration between Iwai, Salyu, a musician who had not debuted yet, and Takeshi Kobayashi, a music producer who had previously worked with Iwai on the soundtrack to his 1996 film Swallowtail Butterfly. Iwai supplied the lyrics of two songs to the project, "Arabesque" and "Tobenai Tsubasa."

In April 2000, Lily Chou-Chou music began to be released, with the single "Glide" and later "Kyōmei (Kūkyo na Ishi)" in June. Three Iwai-directed music videos were produced for the project, "Glide," "Kyōmei (Kūkyo na Ishi)" and "Tobenai Tsubasa." Salyu performed "Kyōmei (Kūkyo na Ishi)" on music shows Hey! Hey! Hey! Music Champ and Music Station in June 2000. The group released their album, Kokyū, in October 2001, a week and a half after the release of the film in Japan.

After the release of the film, the group ceased to release music. In 2003, the Lily Chou-Chou song "Kaifuku Suru Kizu" was featured in the Quentin Tarantino film Kill Bill Vol. 1. Salyu debuted as a musician in 2004 with the single "Valon," a collaboration with hip-hop musician Ilmari. She began working with Kobayashi as her producer since her debut, and continues to work with him. Some of Salyu's most notable songs have been composed by him, such as "Atarashii Yes," "Corteo (Gyōretsu)," "Platform," "To U" and "Valon." Salyu included the Lily Chou-Chou songs "Hōwa" and "Glide" on her 2008 greatest hits album Merkmal. On her 2009 tour for Merkmal, she performed "Erotic," "Glide," "Hikōsen," "Kaifuku Suru Kizu," "Sight" and "Tobenai Tsubasa."

For the film's 10th anniversary in 2010, the band reformed as a three-member band featuring guitarist Yukio Nagoshi, however without the direct involvement of Iwai. The group released a digital single, "Ether," on December 8, 2010. The music video for the song was exclusively debuted at MTV Japan on December 1. The group plan to perform a live at the Nakano Sun Plaza Hall on December 15.

Fictional back-story

Lily Chou-Chou is portrayed as the stage name of a solo musician, . She was born on December 8, 1980, at 10:50pm, a fact that fans in the film link to the same time of the murder of Beatles' member John Lennon. She has an official website, Lilyholic, which features as a back-story to the film, including news articles and a discography. The BBS on this website is a crucial feature to the plot of the film. Lily Chou-Chou is portrayed as being extremely successful, with her CDs lining prominent displays in music stores such as Tsutaya.

Lily Chou-Chou was originally the vocalist of the band , that formed broke up two years after their debut in 1995. Kayama later lead the major-label band . Lily Chou-Chou wrote the lyrics for the band's songs, though some fans believe they were ghostwritten. The band is described as having number one releases on music charts. The group debuted with the single  on February 21, 1995, which reached number one on the singles charts. The film mentioned the band having an album named , and songs "Abnormality" and "Manic & Depressive." Many of her fans do not like to link Lily Chou-Chou's solo music with Kayama. In the film, when a fan suggested Kayama took part in creating Lily Chou-Chou's solo music, many fans became heated and fought him.

Her fan base is described as being composed of younger people. These fans are described as fanatic, with some of Lily Chou-Chou's detractors likening her to a cult leader. One of her fans even committed suicide in protest of the content of her second album, Kokyū.

Lily Chou-Chou's music is said to have ether, a term used both by Lily Chou-Chou and her fans. She describes ether as the fabric of the universe, and assigns colours to different types of ether (the emotion despair is close to "red" ether, while hope is close to "blue" ether). Lily Chou-Chou also describes the moods of her albums in terms of these colours.

On Lily Chou-Chou's official site are two news articles from a fictional newspaper, describing an incident after a Lily Chou-Chou concert, in which a 15-year-old, Shūsuke Hoshino, is apparently crushed to death by fans wanting to see Lily Chou-Chou. Later news puts doubt to this, as a stab wound piercing his heart was discovered during the autopsy. These news reports are direct references to events in the film.

Actual discography

Album

Singles

Fictional discography

Albums

Extended play

Singles

References

External links 
Official site 
Official reunion website 
Official YouTube channel 
Official Twitter 

Fictional musical groups
Japanese pop music groups
Musical groups established in 2000